Kafr Al-Maa (Arabic: كفر الماء) is one of the Al-Kourah District towns, in the province of Irbid, Jordan, and away from the Irbid city district center 28 km to the south-west, and the capital, Amman, about 81 km in the north-west direction. It had a population of 17919 in 2015.

Location
Kafr Al-Maa is located south of Der Abi Saeed, north of Kufr Rakeb.

History
In 1596 it appeared in the Ottoman tax registers named as  Kafr Alma, situated in the nahiya (subdistrict) of Kura, part of the Sanjak of Ajlun. It had 45 households and 10 bachelors; all Muslim. The villagers paid a fixed tax-rate of 25% on agricultural products; including wheat, barley, olive trees/vineyards/fruit trees, goats and bee-hives; in addition to occasional revenues. The total tax was 10,000 akçe.

In 1838 Kafr Al-Maa's inhabitants were noted as being  predominantly Sunni Muslims.

The Jordanian census of 1961 found 1,517 inhabitants in Kufr Ma.

References

Bibliography

 
 

Villages in Irbid governorate